Hakea stenophylla is a shrub or tree in the family Proteacea, with sweetly scented creamy-white flowers. It is endemic to Western Australia.

Description
The branchlets are thickly covered with flattened, soft white hairs, occasionally rusty coloured. The surface quickly becoming smooth. The leaves are initially thickly covered with flattened, rusty coloured, smooth soft hairs quickly becoming smooth. The leaves taper abruptly to a short pointed hook at the apex.

Taxonomy
The species was first formally described by Robert Brown in 1830 and published in Supplementum primum prodromi florae Novae Hollandiae. The specific epithet (stenophylla) is derived from the Greek stenos meaning "narrow" and phyllon meaning "leaf" referring to the shape of the leaves.

There are two recognized subspecies:

Both subspecies are also distinguished by their differing fruit valve thickness.

Distribution
H. stenophylla is endemic to an area in the Mid West and the Gascoyne regions of Western Australia where it is found on sandplains and among coastal sand dunes where it grows in sandy and loamy soils often around limestone usually with spinifex.

References

stenophylla
Eudicots of Western Australia
Plants described in 1830
Taxa named by Robert Brown (botanist, born 1773)